Marcel Roșca (born 18 October 1943) is a retired Romanian pistol shooter. He competed in the individual 25 m rapid-fire event at the 1964 and 1968 Olympics and won a silver medal in 1968, placing sixth in 1964. He also won three team medals at the world championships in 1966, 1970 and 1974.

Biography 
Roșca was born in a family of singers and always wanted to become one. In 1968, he graduated from the Theatrical Arts Academy, but instead of pursuing a theatrical career, he became chief officer of the Traffic Division of the Bucharest Police.

In 1970, he was a winner of the X Factor TV show "Star without name". After that he sang as a bass with the Romanian National Opera before defecting to West Germany in 1984.

References

External links 

Personal website

1943 births
Living people
Romanian male sport shooters
ISSF pistol shooters
Olympic shooters of Romania
Shooters at the 1964 Summer Olympics
Shooters at the 1968 Summer Olympics
Olympic silver medalists for Romania
Olympic medalists in shooting
Medalists at the 1968 Summer Olympics
20th-century Romanian male opera singers
Romanian basses
Romanian defectors
Caragiale National University of Theatre and Film alumni